Erdene is a Mongolian word meaning "jewel".

Places in Mongolia
 Erdene, Dornogovi, a district of Dornogovi Province
 Erdene, Govi-Altai, a district of Govi-Altai Province
 Erdene, Töv, a district of Töv Province

People
 Erdene (given name)
 Sengiin Erdene (1929-2000), Mongolian novelist and writer
 Terunofuji Haruo, born Gantulgyn Gan-Erdene, a Japanese-Mongolian sumo wrestler